Carl Frederik Axel Bror Baron von Blixen-Finecke (15 August 1822 – 6 January 1873) was a Danish politician and nobleman.

Early life 
Carl Frederik Blixen-Finecke was born on 15 August 1822 in Dallund to Conrad Frederik Christian Blixen-Finecke (1791–1829) and Charlotta Lovisa Gyllenkrok (1796–1829). His family originated in Pomerania. He held the family seat at Näsbyholm Castle.

Career 
Finecke served as a Member of Parliament from 1851–52, 1858–61, and 1862–64. He served as the Minister of Foreign Affairs during Carl Edvard Rotwitt's ministry. After Rotwitt's death on February 8, 1860, he served as council president until a new government was formed.

Family 
Carl baron Blixen was married two times. First in 1842 with Gustafva Charlotta Adelaide Sofia Ankarcrona (1821-1890) with whom he had two children, a son Frederik Theodor Hans Anna Wolfgang Christian Blixen-Finecke (1847-1919) and a daughter Charlotta Antoinette Louise Ulrikka Blixen-Finecke (1845-1928). 

They divorced and in 1854 he married Princess Auguste Sophie Friederike of Hesse-Kassel, daughter of Prince William of Hesse-Kassel and Princess Charlotte of Denmark. The couple had two sons. 
   
His grandsons by his son Frederik were the Swedish nobleman Bror von Blixen-Finecke, and equestrian Hans von Blixen-Finecke.

References 

1822 births
1873 deaths
19th-century Danish politicians
Foreign ministers of Denmark